Ken Veevers (29 July 1909 – 13 February 1973) was  a former Australian rules footballer who played with Collingwood and Fitzroy in the Victorian Football League (VFL).

Notes

External links 

		
Ken Veevers's profile at Collingwood Forever

1909 births
1973 deaths
Australian rules footballers from Victoria (Australia)
Collingwood Football Club players
Fitzroy Football Club players